The Nuclear Safety Council (Spanish: Consejo de Seguridad Nuclear; CSN) is the independent Spanish institution of the General State Administration, whose main purpose is to ensure nuclear safety and the radiation protection of people and the environment. Its structure, functions, competencies and organization were extensively modified in October 2007 with law reforms. It is also a member of the Western European Nuclear Regulators' Association.

It also provides the operational data of nuclear power plants located in Spanish territory, reporting the mode of operation, thermal power, electric power, primary pressure, primary temperature, nuclear reactors, among others.

History

In 1975 Luis E. Echávarri was made project manager of the Almaraz Nuclear Power Plant. In 1985 he became Technical Director of the Spanish Nuclear Safety Council (CSN), and in 1987 he was named Commissioner of the CSN.

External links 
 https://www.csn.es/en/home

Atoms for Peace
International Atomic Energy Agency
Nuclear proliferation
Nuclear power in Spain
Government of Spain